Melady House is a historic house in Alexandria, Louisiana.

Description and history
The house is located at 5800 England Drive. It was built  in Rapides Parish in the Colonial Revival style. The property was added to the National Register of Historic Places on February 23, 1996.

See also
 Historic preservation
 National Register of Historic Places in Rapides Parish, Louisiana

References

External links
 
 
 

Houses on the National Register of Historic Places in Louisiana
Colonial Revival architecture in Louisiana
Houses completed in 1905
Houses in Alexandria, Louisiana
National Register of Historic Places in Rapides Parish, Louisiana
1905 establishments in Louisiana